Frank Area Godchaux Sr. (November 29, 1879 – July 3, 1965) was a president of the Louisiana Rice Milling Company, a $10,000,000 corporation. He was a letterman and quarterback for the Vanderbilt Commodores on the 1899 team, transferring from LSU in 1897. He and his son Frank Godchaux Jr were the first father-son Vandy lettermen. Godchaux Sr. was the only child of pioneering merchant Gustave Godchaux, whose parents came from France to Louisiana.

See also
Detailed and extensive document of the cattle farms of Frank A. Godchaux Jr. and Sr. in Vermilion Parish.

References

External links

1879 births
People from Abbeville, Louisiana
Vanderbilt Commodores football players
LSU Tigers football players
American football quarterbacks
Players of American football from Louisiana
1965 deaths
Vanderbilt Commodores baseball players
Baseball outfielders